Allahabad-e Hajjiabad (also Romanized as Allahābād-e Ḩājjīābād) is a village in Chahdegal Rural District, Negin Kavir District, Fahraj County, Kerman Province, Iran. At the 2006 census, its population was 294, in 67 families.

References 

Populated places in Fahraj County